Calathella is a genus of fungi in the mushroom family Marasmiaceae. According to the Dictionary of the Fungi (10th edition, 2008), the genus contains nine species found in Europe and North America. The genus was circumscribed by the English mycologist Derek Reid in 1964.

Description
The genus contains fungi that produce small tubular or cup-shaped cyphelloid fruit bodies. The fruit bodies are characterized by encrusted surface hairs with rounded tips, uniform basidia (swollen at the base), and spores that range in shape from oblong-elliptical to cylindrical.

See also
List of Marasmiaceae genera

References

Marasmiaceae
Agaricales genera